The Compressed Gas Association (CGA) is an American trade association for the industrial and medical gas supply industries.

The CGA publishes standards and practices that codify industry practices.  In cases where government regulation is inspecific, CGA documents are considered authoritative.   CGA falls into a group of trade associations whose publications are relied on by government.  These groups include the National Fire Protection Association (NFPA) and ASTM International. For example, the state of Montana, the U.S. Army, and OSHA point to CGA documents for regulatory guidance.

Cylinder valve openings
The CGA provides detail specifications for the outlet connections of gas containers. They are based on the characteristics of the gas and the storage pressure. flammability, toxicity, state (permanent gas or liquified) and corrosiveness of the gas. These connections are identified by a 3-digit number, such as CGA-555. The range of available connection standards covers the majority of the range of industrial, ultra-pure and medical gases in use, including the medical pin index safety system, scuba cylinder valves and liquefied natural gas for home use.

The standards include:
 CGA V-1 Standard for Compressed Gas Cylinder Valve Outlet and Inlet Connections
 CGA V-7 Standard Method of Determining Cylinder Valve Outlet Connections for Industrial Gas Mixtures
 CGA V-7.1 Standard Method of Determining Cylinder Valve Outlet Connections for Medical Gases

References

External links
 

Business organizations based in the United States
Industrial gases